HMNZS Moa (P3553) was a Moa-class inshore patrol vessel of the Royal New Zealand Navy. It was commissioned in 1983 for the Naval Volunteer Reserve and decommissioned in 2007.

Moa was the second ship of this name to serve in the Royal New Zealand Navy and was named after the Moa bird from New Zealand.

After she was decommissioned in January 2007, she was sold on in March to a Picton builder who renamed the vessel Flightless. On Friday 20 June 2008 the vessel, moored at anchor on the eastern side of Waikawa Bay, Picton, was struck by a commercial fishing boat, with the loss of two lives aboard the fishing boat.
After an extensive refit Flightless is now owned by Pure Salt Ltd and operates as an expedition vessel, providing adventure charters in Fiordland & Stewart Island.

See also 
 Patrol boats of the Royal New Zealand Navy

References

Moa-class patrol boats
Picton, New Zealand
1983 ships